Chamara Iroshan Dunusinghe (born October 19, 1970, Colombo) is a Sri Lankan Australian former cricketer who played in 5 Tests and one ODI from in 1995. He attended Nalanda College Colombo.

International career
Chamara is the 64th Sri Lanka Test Cap, when he made his debut in New Zealand Vs Sri Lanka at Napier New Zealand 1994/95 and scored 91. He also became the first Sri Lankan to be dismissed for nervous 90's on test debut.

References 

 Nelson Mendis - head coach of Nalanda

1970 births
Living people
Sri Lanka Test cricketers
Sri Lanka One Day International cricketers
Sri Lankan cricketers
Basnahira North cricketers
Alumni of Nalanda College, Colombo
Saracens Sports Club cricketers
Sri Lankan emigrants to Australia
Wicket-keepers